De Trieme (Low Saxon: De Triem) is a village in Noardeast-Fryslân municipality in the province of Friesland, the Netherlands. It had a population of around 318 in January 2017. Before 2019, the village was part of the Kollumerland en Nieuwkruisland municipality.

The village was first mentioned in 1467 as Trema, and means beam bridge. In 1840, De Trieme was home to 294 people.

Gallery

References

External links

Noardeast-Fryslân
Populated places in Friesland